The Ethical Standards in Public Life etc. (Scotland) Act 2000 (asp 7) is an Act of the Scottish Parliament which established that the Scottish Ministers had to issue a code of conduct for councillors, and put in place mechanisms for dealing with councillors in contravention of the code. It was introduced by Scottish Executive minister Wendy Alexander.

The Act was most notable for its repeal of Section 28 of the Local Government Act 1988 in Scotland, which had prevented local authorities from "the teaching of the acceptability of homosexuality as a pretended family relationship."  This repeal was highly controversial, and Stagecoach Group founder Brian Souter led a campaign against it.  The bill did require that councils would, in their dealings with children, have to regard the value of a stable family relationship, and that any education about family life would be appropriate to the child's age and development.

It passed on 21 June 2000 with 99 votes for and 17 against, with 2 abstentions, and received Royal Assent on 4 July 2000.  The Local Government Act 2003 repealed Section 28 in England and Wales three years later.

Ethical Standards in Public Life framework
A framework and Code of Conduct was established which applied to Local authority councillors and members of Scottish public bodies. The Act applies to Executive non-departmental public bodies, NHS Public Bodies, Scottish Water and further education colleges in Scotland.

Standards Commission for Scotland
The Standards Commission for Scotland is responsible for enforcing the Code of Conduct.  They act upon reports presented by the Chief Investigation Officer, a separate office.  Members of the commission are appointed by Scottish Ministers. The commission has a protocol for shared aims and objectives with the Scottish Public Services Ombudsman.

Commissioner for Ethical Standards in Public Life in Scotland
The Commissioner for Ethical Standards in Public Life in Scotland (CESPLS) is responsible for investigating any complaints made under the Code of Conduct.  They are appointed by the Scottish Ministers and are operationally independent of the Standards Commission.  The CESPLS will make a determination if the complaint is relevant or if another body can assist the complainant; the CESPLS must explain their decision.  If an investigation is carried out the CESPLS will produce a report for the commission.  The commission can choose to direct the CESPLS to conduct further investigations, convene a hearing or do neither.

From 17 January 2002 to 31 March 2011 the CESPLS was known as the Chief Investigating Officer (CIO).

Restricted applicability
The Act does not cover the conduct of Members of the Scottish Parliament, Scottish Ministers, employees of the Scottish Government or public bodies not mentioned in the Act.  These complaints are handled by the Scottish Parliamentary Standards Commissioner for MSPs, the First Minister for ministers and Scottish Public Services Ombudsman for employees of the Scottish Government.  Other complaints need to be forwarded to the Scottish Government.

The Act is designed to apply to officers and members who are responsible for spending public money, as such the public bodies not covered usually spend a limited amount of public money.  Such bodies include Community councils which spend little, if any, public money. Further, certain public bodies cannot be covered due to legal restrictions arising from how they were established.

See also
 List of Acts of the Scottish Parliament from 1999
 Standards Board for England

References

External links

Acts of the Scottish Parliament 2000
LGBT law in the United Kingdom
Local government in Scotland
LGBT rights in Scotland
Ombudsmen in Scotland
2000 in LGBT history